Sitapur  Assembly constituency is  one of the 403 constituencies of the Uttar Pradesh Legislative Assembly,  India. It is a part of the Sitapur district and one  of the five assembly constituencies in the Sitapur Lok Sabha constituency. First election in this assembly constituency was held in 1952 after the "DPACO (1951)" (delimitation order) was passed in 1951. After the "Delimitation of Parliamentary and Assembly Constituencies Order" was passed in 2008, the constituency was assigned identification number 146.

Wards  / Areas
Extent  of Sitapur Assembly constituency is PCs Neriklan, Tikawapara, Ramnagar,  Khagesiamau, Sitapur, Akoiya, Raseora, Rahimabad, Sahsapur, Alam Nagar, Kanawakhera, Parsehara, Majlispur, Ramkoat, Jawahirpur of Sitapur (Sadar) KC,  PCs Khairabad, Asodhar, Gangapur Ulfatrai, Pakaria, Suhetara, Bhemari, Husainpur Kaimhara, Makhuwapur, Sultanpur Kamaicha, Tappa Khajuria, Paharpur,  Asharafpur, Dahelia Srirang, Akbarganj, Bhadiyasi, Bhagautipur of Khairabad KC, PCs Kachnar, Rampur Bhuda, Hempur of Aliya KC, Sitapur MB & Khairabad  MB of Sitapur Tehsil (Sadar).

Members of the Legislative Assembly

Election results

2022

2017
17th Vidhan Sabha

See also

Sitapur district
Sitapur Lok Sabha constituency
Sixteenth Legislative Assembly of Uttar Pradesh
Uttar Pradesh Legislative Assembly
Vidhan Bhawan

References

External links
 

Assembly constituencies of Uttar Pradesh
Sitapur